Black Friday is the name given to an incident occurring on 8 September 1978 (17 Shahrivar 1357 in the Iranian calendar) in Iran, in which 64, or at least 100 people were shot dead and 205 injured by the Pahlavi military in Jaleh Square in Tehran. According to the military historian Spencer C. Tucker, 94 were killed on Black Friday, consisting of 64 protesters and 30 government security forces. The deaths were described as the pivotal event in the Iranian Revolution that ended any "hope for compromise" between the protest movement and the regime of Shah Mohammad Reza Pahlavi.

Background

As protests against the Shah's rule continued during the spring and the summer of 1978, the Iranian government declared martial law. On 8 September, thousands gathered in Tehran's Jaleh Square for a religious demonstration, unaware that the government had declared martial law a day earlier.

Massacre
A crowd of the protesters had gathered in Jaleh square, Tehran, who were surrounded by the army. The gathering was shot at indiscriminately by the army leading to death of numerous people.

Aftermath

Black Friday is thought to have marked the point of no return for the revolution, and it led to the abolition of Iran's monarchy less than a year later. It is also believed that Black Friday played a crucial role in further radicalizing the protest movement, uniting the opposition to the Shah and mobilized the masses. The incident is described by historian Ervand Abrahamian as "a sea of blood between the shah and the people." Initially, opposition and western journalists claimed that the Iranian army had massacred thousands of protesters. The clerical leadership announced that "thousands have been massacred by Zionist troops". According to the historian Abbas Amanat: 

The events triggered protests that continued for another four months. The day after Black Friday, Amir-Abbas Hoveyda resigned as minister of court for unrelated reasons.

A general strike in October shut down the petroleum industry that was essential to the administration's survival, "sealing the Shah's fate". The continuation of protests ultimately led to Shah leaving Iran in January 1979, clearing the way for the Iranian Revolution, led by Ayatollah Ruhollah Khomeini.

Legacy
Initially, Western media and opposition reported "15,000 dead and wounded", but Iranian government officials reported that 86 people had died in Tehran in the whole day. French social theorist Michel Foucault first reported that 2,000 to 3,000 people had died in Jaleh Square, and he later raised that number to 4,000. Johann Beukes, author of Foucault in Iran, 1978–1979, notes that "Foucault seems to have adhered to this exaggerated death count at Djaleh Square, propagated by the revolting masses themselves. Thousands were wounded, but the death toll unlikely accounted to more than hundred casualties".

The BBC's correspondent in Iran, Andrew Whitley, reported that hundreds had died.

According to the military historian Spencer C. Tucker, 94 were killed on Black Friday, consisting of 64 protesters and 30 government security forces. According to the Iranologist Richard Foltz, 64 protesters died at Jaleh Square.

According to Emadeddin Baghi, a former researcher at the Martyrs Foundation (Bonyad Shahid, part of the current Iranian government, which compensates families of victims) hired "to make sense of the data" on those killed on Black Friday, 64 were killed in Jaleh Square on Black Friday, with two females: one woman and a young girl. On the same day in other parts of the capital, 24 people died in clashes with martial law forces, with one female, making the total casualties on the same day to 88 deaths. Another source puts the Martyrs Foundation tabulation of dead at 84 during that day.

The square's name was later changed to the Square of Martyrs (Maidan-e Shohada) by the Islamic republic.

Since the 2000s, some former Pahlavi dynasty politicians have suggested greater ambiguity in the situation, in particular the presence of Palestinian guerrillas in Iran, who they believe were agitators.

In art

In Persian

In 1978 shortly after the massacre, the Iranian musician Hossein Alizadeh set Siavash Kasraie's poem about the event to music. Mohammad Reza Shajarian sang the piece "Jāleh Khun Shod" (Jaleh [Square] became bloody).

In English
Nastaran Akhavan, one of the survivors, wrote the book Spared about the event. The book explains how the author was forced into a massive wave of thousands of angry protesters, who were later massacred by the Shah's military. The 2016 adventure video game 1979 Revolution: Black Friday is based on the event. The game is directed by Navid Khonsari, who was a child at the time of the revolution and admitted he did not have a realistic view of what was taking place. Khonsari described creating the game as "[wanting] people to feel the passion and the elation of being in the revolution – of feeling that you could possibly make a change."

See also
 Iranian Revolution
 Cinema Rex fire

References

Protests in Iran
Conflicts in 1978
1978 protests
September 1978 events in Asia
Iranian Revolution
1978 in Iran
Mass murder in 1978
Massacres in Iran
History of Tehran